Monroe County School District is a school district in Monroe County, Alabama.

References

External links
 

Education in Monroe County, Alabama